The Talent Award of Korea is an award bestowed by the Deputy Prime Minister and Minister of Education of Korea from 2014. 

Until 2013, this was the Talent Medal of Korea, bestowed by the President of the Republic of Korea with a post-nominal (KTM) and Presidential Medal.

It recognizes those individuals who are likely to become Korea's future leaders and have performed exemplary talents or outstanding meritorious service. Fifty high school students, 40 college students, and 10 adults are selected based on their intelligence, passion, creativity, and community spirit. ("선발대상: 지혜와 열정으로 탁월한 성취를 이루며, 창의적 사고로 새로운 가치를 창출하고, 배려와 공동체 의식 등을 두루 갖춘 우수 인재"). The recipients are given 2,000,000 KRW.

History of the award
The Korean government has given awards for exceptional talent since 2001. The name of the so-called Talent Award has varied during this time. Beginning in 2001, the Korean government gave the Award for Outstanding Talent who will lead 21st Century.

In 2008, president Lee Myung-bak established the Talent Medal of Korea, with a quota of 100 awards per year. From 2008 to 2013, it was bestowed upon a total of 610 people. While it was a civilian award, it could also have been awarded to military personnel, but there was only one military recipient. Notable recipients included Son Yeon-jae and Yuna Kim.

Following severe critiques from non-scientists and politicians, who criticized this award is mostly bestowed to scientists and inventors, the Talent Medal of Korea was replaced by the Talent Award of Korea beginning in 2014.

See also
 New Knowledge Worker of Korea

References

External links
 "Korea Federation of Talent" 

Orders, decorations, and medals of South Korea
Awards established in 2014
2014 establishments in South Korea